The 2022 Pan Am Male & Female Badminton Cup was a continental badminton championships tournament to crown the best men's and women's team for the Americas. It was held in Acapulco, Mexico from 17 to 20 February.

Tournament 
The team event of 2022 Pan Am Badminton Championships officially Pan Am M&F Cup 2022, is a continental qualification tournament of 2022 Thomas & Uber Cup, and also to crown the best men's and women's badminton team in Pan America. This event organized by the Badminton Pan America and Federacion Mexicana de Badminton. 12 teams, consisting of 6 men's teams and 6 women's teams entered the tournament.

Venue 
The team event is being held at Mundo Imperial in the city of Acapulco, Mexico.

Medalists

Medal table

Male Cup

Group A 

Canada vs United States

Guatemala vs United States

Canada vs Guatemala

Group B 

Mexico vs Brazil

Peru vs Brazil

Mexico vs Peru

Fifth place match 
Guatemala vs Peru

First to fourth place

Semifinals 
Canada vs Mexico

United States vs Brazil

Third place match
Mexico vs United States

Final
Canada vs Brazil

Female Cup

Group A 

Canada vs Guatemala

Peru vs Guatemala

Canada vs Peru

Group B 

United States vs Mexico

Brazil vs Mexico

United States vs Brazil

Fifth place match 
Peru vs Mexico

First to fourth place

Semifinals 
Canada vs Guatemala

Brazil vs United States

Third place match
Guatemala vs Brazil

Final
Canada vs United States

References

External links
Tournament link: team results

Pan Am Badminton Championships
Pan Am Badminton Championships
Pan Am Badminton Championships
Badminton tournaments in Mexico
International sports competitions hosted by Mexico
Pan Am Badminton Championships